Let's Party can refer to:
"Let's Party" (song), a 1989 song by Jive Bunny
 "Let's Party", a song by Mumzy Stranger from his 2008 mixtape
"Let's Party!", a song by Per Gessle, seen on the 2008 re-release of his The World According to Gessle album